Marcon Bezzina (born 11 September 1985) is a Maltese judoka.

She originally competed in the lightweight (−57 kg) class. She competed at the 2004 Olympic Games, lost her first match, reached the repechage round, but lost again. She later switched to the half middleweight (−63 kg) class. She won a bronze medal at the 2006 Commonwealth Championships, and was the Maltese flagbearer at the 2008 Olympic Games. In the Olympic tournament she lost her first match, and did not reach the repechage.

References

External links
 

 https://web.archive.org/web/20080813090446/http://www.marconbezzina.com/Welcome.html
 http://www.teambath.com/?p=4441

1985 births
Living people
Judoka at the 2004 Summer Olympics
Judoka at the 2008 Summer Olympics
Olympic judoka of Malta
Maltese female judoka
Judoka at the 2014 Commonwealth Games
Commonwealth Games competitors for Malta
European Games competitors for Malta
Judoka at the 2015 European Games